Vibeke Larsen  (born 15 June 1971) is a Norwegian Sami politician of Nordkalottfolket, formerly of the Labour Party and .

She was born in Vassdalen in Narvik. She was elected member to the Sami Parliament of Norway first time in 2005. She served as president of the Sami Parliament from 2016 to 2017.

The Larsen Council
Larsen became President of the Sami Parliament following a motion of no confidence against than-president Aili Keskitalo in December 2016. Her council was a coalition between the Labour Party, Árja and the Conservatives. From December 2016 until 28 January 2017, her council consisted of herself as president, Ronny Wilhelmsen (Labour) as vice president, Mariann Wollmann Magga (Labour), Lars Filip Paulsen (Conservative) and Inger Eline Eriksen Fjellgren (Árja).

From 28 January 2017 until March the same year, her council only consisted of herself, Wollmann Magga, Paulsen and Eriksen Fjellgren after she fired vice president Wilhelmsen following internal conflict in the Labour Party. She argued that Wilhelmsen had worked against her and supported a motion of no confidence against her. She also resigned her membership of the Labour Party and thereby became the first Sami Parliament president to not belong to a party. She appointed Lars Filip Paulsen as her vice president and continued to serve as president until the 2017 election, when Aili Keskitalo formed her third council and succeeded her as president.

References

1971 births
Living people
Norwegian politicians
Members of the Sámi Parliament of Norway
Norwegian Sámi people
Norwegian Sámi politicians
Labour Party (Norway) politicians
People from Narvik